Menkheperre was a prince of the Eighteenth Dynasty of Egypt, one of two known sons of Pharaoh Thutmose III and his Great Royal Wife Merytre-Hatshepsut. His name is the throne name of his father and means “Eternal are the manifestations of Re”.

He is one of six known children of Thutmose and Merytre; his siblings are Pharaoh Amenhotep II, and princesses Nebetiunet, Meritamen, the second Meritamen and Iset. He is depicted together with his sisters on a statue of their maternal grandmother Hui (now in the British Museum). It is likely that some canopic jar fragments from the Valley of the Queens are his.

Sources

Princes of the Eighteenth Dynasty of Egypt
Children of Thutmose III